Alan Kent Haruf (February 24, 1943 – November 30, 2014) was an American novelist.

Life
Haruf was born in Pueblo, Colorado, the son of a Methodist minister. In 1965 he graduated with a BA from Nebraska Wesleyan University, where he would later teach, and earned an MFA from the Iowa Writers' Workshop at the University of Iowa in 1973.

Before becoming a writer, Haruf worked in a variety of places, including a chicken farm in Colorado, a construction site in Wyoming, a rehabilitation hospital in Denver, a hospital in Phoenix, a presidential library in Iowa, an alternative high school in Wisconsin, and colleges in Nebraska and Illinois and as an English teacher with the Peace Corps in Turkey. He lived with his wife, Cathy, in Salida, Colorado, until his death in 2014. He had three daughters from his first marriage.

All of Haruf's novels take place in the fictional town of Holt, in eastern Colorado. Holt is based on Yuma, Colorado, one of Haruf's residences in the early 1980s. His first novel, The Tie That Binds (1984), received a Whiting Award and a special Hemingway Foundation/PEN citation. Where You Once Belonged followed in 1990. A number of his short stories have appeared in literary magazines.

Plainsong was published in 1999 and became a U.S. bestseller. Verlyn Klinkenborg called it "a novel so foursquare, so delicate and lovely, that it has the power to exalt the reader." Plainsong won the Mountains & Plains Booksellers Award and the Maria Thomas Award in Fiction and was a finalist for the National Book Award for Fiction.

Eventide, a sequel to Plainsong, was published in 2004. Library Journal described the writing as "honest storytelling that is compelling and rings true." Jonathan Miles saw it as a "repeat performance" and "too goodhearted." A third novel in the series, Benediction was published in 2014.

In the summer of 2014 Haruf finished his last novel, Our Souls at Night, which was published posthumously in 2015. He completed it just before his death. The novel was subsequently adapted in 2017 into a film by the same name, directed by Ritesh Batra and starring Robert Redford and Jane Fonda.

On November 30, 2014, Haruf died at his home in Salida, Colorado, at the age of 71, from interstitial lung disease.

Recognition 

1986 – Whiting Award for fiction
 1999 – Finalist for the 1999 National Book Award for Plainsong
 2005 – Colorado Book Award for Eventide
 2005 – Finalist for the Book Sense Award for Eventide
 2009 – Dos Passos Prize for Literature
 2012 – Wallace Stegner Award
 2014 – Folio Prize shortlist for Benediction

Works 

Novels
The Tie That Binds (1984)
Where You Once Belonged (1990)
Plainsong (1999)
Eventide (2004)
Benediction (2013); adapted for the stage in February 2015.
Our Souls at Night (26 May 2015); adapted into a 2017 Netflix movie

Essays
"The Making of a Writer". Granta Magazine, issue 129: "Fate". London: Granta, 2014.
Other
West of Last Chance, with photographer Peter Brown (2008)

References

External links
Meet the Writers: Kent Haruf Barnes and Noble profile and interview
Q & A with Kent Haruf 
What the Critics Say About Kent Haruf
 Notable Former Volunteers / Arts and Literature – Peace Corps official site
Profile at The Whiting Foundation

20th-century American novelists
21st-century American novelists
American male novelists
Novelists from Colorado
Nebraska Wesleyan University alumni
Peace Corps volunteers
People from Pueblo, Colorado
1943 births
2014 deaths
Iowa Writers' Workshop alumni
University of Iowa alumni
Deaths from lung disease
Nebraska Wesleyan University faculty
People from Salida, Colorado
20th-century American male writers
21st-century American male writers